Płochocin  is a village in the administrative district of Gmina Ożarów Mazowiecki, within Warsaw West County, Masovian Voivodeship, in east-central Poland.

14 September 1939 Wehrmacht soldiers executed 4 persons.

References

Villages in Warsaw West County